Alacizumab pegol is an antineoplastic agent. Chemically, it is a pegylated F(ab')2 fragment of a monoclonal antibody.

References 

Monoclonal antibodies
Experimental cancer drugs